Barooga is a border town in the Riverina region of New South Wales, Australia, located in the Berrigan Shire local government area. It is situated just north of the Murray River which forms the border with
Victoria. Barooga's population at the 2016 census was 1,817.

Barooga is a mainly residential area and most of its commercial and industrial needs are met in its twin town of Cobram on the south side of the Murray River.

History
Barooga Post Office opened on 1 May 1896.

Heritage listings 
Barooga has a number of heritage-listed sites, including:
 Vermont Street: Old Cobram-Barooga Bridge

Attractions
Being only two and a half hours drive from Melbourne, Barooga is a popular holiday destination because it offers two registered clubs, a 36-hole golf course and river attractions and also a large Botanical Garden.
Other attractions include a twenty-metre swing bridge, Quicks Beach, walking tracks and the Barooga Markets.
Barooga is also home to the Barooga PBR - On The Murray which is a Bull Riding event held in December.

Education
Barooga Public School caters for primary school students. High School students must cross the river to Cobram.  The Barooga Public School follows Victorian, rather than New South Wales, school holidays.

Population
According to the 2016 census of Population, there were 1,817 people in Barooga.

Aboriginal and Torres Strait Islander people made up 2% of the population.
81.8% of people were born in Australia. The next most common countries of birth were England 1.6%, Malaysia 1.2% and Philippines 0.8%.
86.6% of people spoke only English at home. Other languages spoken at home included Malay 0.6% and Mandarin 0.5%.
The most common responses for religion were Catholic 28.3.7%, No Religion 24.0% and Anglican 19.3%.[1]

Postcode

Barooga shares the postcode of 3644 with its twin town, Cobram. It is unusual for a town in New South Wales to have a postcode that begins with "3" which ordinarily signifies a location in Victoria. This is probably due to the mail being delivered via Cobram.

Sport 
Barooga has an Australian rules football team in the Murray Football League called the Barooga Hawks, and a cricket team in the Murray Valley Cricket Association.

Golfers play at the Cobram Barooga Golf Club (a 36 hole course) on Barooga Golf Course Road.

Other sporting clubs include soccer, netball, tennis, table tennis and bowls.

Barooga also hosted the 2022 TPS Murray River golf competition at the Cobram Barooga Golf club. The competition was played on the CBGC's Old course and was won by Hannah Green, who after winning became the first woman to win a 72-hole Mixed-gender golf competition in the world.

Shopping 
Barooga has a shopping strip known to the locals as 'Barooga Mall'. There is an IGA Express supermarket, general store, take away and petrol station, Pirate Petes (Dollar Store), post office, bakery, pharmacy, vehicle service centre.

When dining out there is the Barooga Hotel, the Barooga Sporties, Cobram Barooga Golf Club and Happy Village Chinese Restaurant & Take Away.

The newly formed “Food Truck Park” by Food Trucks Australia (Ray Khouri: Founder) has transformed the Pirates Treasure House front carpark into a tourist destination from June 2020.

Nearby towns 
Cobram, Tocumwal, Mulwala and Berrigan

Events
On 21 March 2013, a tornado affected Barooga causing widespread damage across a number of towns. Millions of dollars worth of damage was caused across Victoria And New South Wales.

References

Towns in Berrigan Shire
Towns in the Riverina
Towns in New South Wales
Populated places on the Murray River